Alan Curtis (born Harry Ueberroth or Harold Neberroth, July 24, 1909 – February 2, 1953) was an American film actor who appeared in over 50 films.

Early life and career
Born Harry Ueberroth or Harold Neberroth in Chicago, he began his career as a model before becoming an actor, appearing in local newspaper ads.

His looks did not go unnoticed in Hollywood. He began appearing in films in the late 1930s, making his screen debut in Winterset (1936). His film activities included a Technicolor appearance in the Alice Faye-Don Ameche film Hollywood Cavalcade (1939) and a memorable role in High Sierra (1941). He was one of the romantic leads in Abbott and Costello's first hit film Buck Privates (1941) and played composer Franz Schubert in The Great Awakening (1941).

His chance for leading-man stardom came when he replaced the unwilling John Garfield in the production Flesh and Fantasy (1943). Curtis played a ruthless killer opposite Gloria Jean. However, the studio cut their performances from the final film version. The footage was later expanded into a B-picture melodrama Destiny (1944). He also portrayed the man framed for murder in Phantom Lady (1944) and the detective Philo Vance. Curtis starred in over two dozen movies.

Personal life
Alan Curtis was married four times and had no children:
Actress Priscilla Lawson, widow of Gerald Lawson. Curtis and Lawson married in Las Vegas, Nevada, on November 14, 1937, and divorced March 11, 1940. 
Actress Ilona Massey, married 1941, divorced 1942 
Model Sandra Lucas: born Alexandra Beryl Crowell in 1917, she was married 1939 to 1945 to musician Lyn Lucas (brother of Clyde Lucas). Curtis and Lucas married in Las Vegas, Nevada, on 8 February 1946: the couple were still married in May 1949 divorcing prior to Curtis' fourth marriage in November 1950. Lucas, identified as socialite Alexandra Crowell Curtis, wed actor John Payne on 27 September 1953, becoming his widow 6 December 1989.
Elizabeth Sundmark Dodero (died 1959), a onetime showgirl, former wife of Argentine millionaire Alberto Dodero, and a close friend of Eva Peron. They married in New York City on November 21, 1950, and divorced the following year. She died in 1959, after marrying, in 1952, saloon singer Hugh Shannon.

Death
Curtis had a routine kidney operation on January 28, 1953, at Saint Clare's Hospital in Manhattan. Several hours after the surgery, as he sipped some tea, he "died" for four minutes when his heart failed. He was revived and seemed to be improving but died five days later, aged 43.  He is buried in the Ueberroth family plot in Memorial Park Cemetery in Skokie, Illinois.

Recognition
Curtis has a star at 7021 Hollywood Boulevard in the Motion Picture section of the Hollywood Walk of Fame. It was dedicated on February 8, 1960.

Filmography

References

External links

 
 

1909 births
1953 deaths
American male film actors
Male actors from Chicago
Burials in Illinois
20th-century American male actors